Ashton Gate Brewery Co Ltd (also known for a time as Hardwick and Co Ltd) was a brewing company based in Bristol, UK. It was one of the first 1000 companies registered in England and Wales.

History 

Thomas Baynton had operated a business on North Street in Ashton Gate under the name Ashton Gate Brewery. The company was established in 1865 in order to acquire the business after Baynton's death. It was one of the first 1000 companies registered with Companies House.

The company changed its name to Hardwick and Co in 1868, reverting to Ashton Gate Brewery Co in 1883, and was listed in Kelly's Directory.

The company was acquired by Bristol Brewery Georges & Co in either 1931 or 1932.

Management 

Ashton Gate Brewery 

The brewery operated at Ashton Gate in Bristol. Additions to the brewery were made in 1905 by brewers' engineers George Adlam, being described architecturally by Foyle in his book Bristol (2004) as "brick and Ham stone with blind lunettes beneath shaped gables." The brewery produced porter and strong beer.

References 

Breweries in England
British companies established in 1865
Food and drink companies established in 1865
Manufacturing companies based in Bristol
1865 establishments in England